Garrison Sergeant Major Vivian Hugh Stuart Davenport  & Bar (12 September 1876 – 8 March 1950) was a British Army soldier of the First World War. He was one of a very small number of soldiers to be twice awarded the Distinguished Conduct Medal for gallantry.

Early life
Davenport was the son of Lieutenant Vivian Davenport, who served with the 26th (Cameronian) Regiment of Foot. He was educated at Bloxham School, Oxfordshire.

Military service
At age 23, Davenport joined the 2nd Battalion, The Border Regiment, serving in Africa, India and Flanders. He was first awarded the Distinguished Conduct Medal (DCM) on 1 April 1915, while serving as company sergeant major. His citation read:

He was awarded a Bar to his DCM several months later, on 13 August 1915:

He was also awarded the Military Cross in the 1915 Birthday Honours. Davenport was invested as a Member of the Order of the British Empire in the 1923 New Year Honours.

References

1876 births
1950 deaths
Border Regiment soldiers
British Army personnel of World War I
Members of the Order of the British Empire
People educated at Bloxham School
Recipients of the Distinguished Conduct Medal
Recipients of the Military Cross